Iowa Highway 188 (Iowa 188) is a state highway in north-central Iowa.  The route is signed both north–south and east–west because of a 90-degree corner near the route's midpoint.  The route begins at Iowa Highway 3 south of Clarksville and ends at U.S. Highway 63 near Tripoli.

Route description

From Iowa 3, Iowa 188 heads north where it crosses the Shell Rock River and forms the eastern boundary of Heery Woods State Park. At four-way intersection with Butler County Road T64 and a gravel road, Iowa 188 turns to the east and becomes an east–west road for the remainder of its journey.

Iowa 188 heads east for  where it crosses into Bremer County one mile (1.6 km) west of Plainfield. One half-mile (0.8 km) into Bremer County, is a diamond interchange with U.S. Route 218 and Iowa Highway 27, the Avenue of the Saints highway. In Plainfield, Iowa 188 crosses over the Cedar River.

History
Iowa 188 was designated in 1945 as a  route which connected US 218 at Plainfield to US 63.  It first appeared on the state highway map in 1946.  Four years later, the highway absorbed Iowa 53, which connected Clarksville to Iowa 10.  Until 1963, the highway appeared very much like it does today.  That year the section of highway between Clarksville and Plainfield was turned over to Butler County officials and the section south of Clarksville became Iowa 122.  Just three years later, the Iowa State Highway Commission changed course and reabsorbed Iowa 122.  Since then the routing has not changed.

Major intersections

References

External links

188